Georgia State Route 7 Connector may refer to:

 Georgia State Route 7 Connector (Fort Valley), a short connector route of State Route 7 in Fort Valley
 Georgia State Route 7 Connector (Lowndes County), a former connector route of State Route 7 that served rural parts of Lowndes County, northwest of Valdosta
 Georgia State Route 7 Connector (Perry), a former connector route of State Route 7 that traveled in the southwestern part of Perry, as a temporary redesignated of State Route 7 Spur

007 Connector